Programma International was one of the first personal computer software publishers. Established in the late 1970s by David Gordon, it published a line of approximately 300 game, programming utility, and office productivity products for the Apple II, Commodore PET, TRS-80 and other personal computer systems. Hayden Publishing bought Programma International in 1980 and the company went out of business in 1983.

Notable titles published

References

Defunct video game companies of the United States
Software companies disestablished in 1983